= Dagbladet (Chicago) =

American daily Norwegian language newspaper (1889–1891)

- Founder: Peer Stromme
- Editor-in-chief: Peer Stromme
- Founded: 1889
- Ceased publication: 1891
- Political alignment: Independent, with socialist and pro-labor leanings
- Language: Norwegian language
- City: Chicago

Dagbladet (English:The Daily Paper) was an American daily newspaper published in the Norwegian language in Chicago from 1889 to 1891.

Peer Stromme was the founding editor of the newspaper. Stromme was also on the editorial staff of Norden (Chicago) from 1888 to 1892. Chicago was at that time the cultural center of Norwegian America with twice as many Norwegian speaking residents as in Minneapolis. Politically, Dagbladet was independent with socialist and pro-labor leanings. The paper favored social progress and tariff reform. Dagbladet also had a weekly edition, titled Nordisk Folkeblad.
